Priscosiren is an extinct genus of mammal which existed in the west Atlantic and Puerto Rico during the early Oligocene (Chattian).

Description
Priscosiren was diagnosed from other "halitheriine" dugongids by Velez-Juarbe and Domning (2014).

Phylogeny
Priscosiren is recovered by Velez-Juarbe and Domning (2014) as sister to the Metaxytherium + Hydrodamalinae and Dugonginae clades.

References

Oligocene sirenians
Fossil taxa described in 2014
Prehistoric placental genera